All Rise may refer to:

 All Rise (Blue album), 2001
 "All Rise" (song), its title song
 All Rise (Naked Raygun album), 1986
 All Rise (TV series), a 2019 American drama television series
 All Rise: A Joyful Elegy for Fats Waller, a 2014 album by Jason Moran
 All Rise for Julian Clary, a short-lived British game show presented by Julian Clary
All Rise, an album by Jazz at Lincoln Center Orchestra
All Rise, an oratorio composed by Wynton Marsalis

See also
 A phrase uttered when a judge enters a courtroom
 A catchphrase associated with American baseball player Aaron Judge